Tepeköy is a village in Bor district of Niğde Province, Turkey. At  it is situated in the southwestern slopes of Melendiz Mountain. The population of Tepeköy was 945 as of 2011.

References 

Villages in Bor District, Niğde